Johnny Ray Wolfe Jr. (born November 7, 1965) is a United States Navy vice admiral who currently serves as the Director for Strategic Systems Programs. Previously, he was the Program Executive Officer for Aegis Ballistic Missile Defense of Missile Defense Agency. Wolfe attended the United States Merchant Marine Academy, graduating with a Bachelor of Science degree in marine systems engineering in 1988. He later earned a Master of Science degree in applied physics at the Naval Postgraduate School.

Personal
Wolfe is the son of Johnny Ray Wolfe Sr. (September 29, 1943 – June 30, 2002) and Frances Jean (McCabe) Wolfe. The couple were married on March 21, 1964, and had two sons.

Wolfe Jr. is married to Anne Wolfe, and they also have two sons.

References

1965 births
Living people
People from Bexar County, Texas
United States Merchant Marine Academy alumni
Naval Postgraduate School alumni
United States Navy admirals
Military personnel from Texas